Algoz, originally spelled Algôs, is a halt on the Algarve Line in Algoz, Silves municipality, Portugal. It was opened on 19 October 1899.

Services
This halt is used by regional trains, operated by Comboios de Portugal.

References

Railway stations in Portugal
Railway stations opened in 1899